Macau participated in the 1994 Asian Games held in Hiroshima from October 2, 1994, to October 16, 1994. Macau was ranked in 26th place, tied with Sri Lanka.

References 

Nations at the 1994 Asian Games
1994
Asian Games